Corinne Louise Hall (born 12 October 1987) is an Australian cricketer who plays as a right-handed batter and occasional right-arm off break bowler for Sydney Thunder in the Women's Big Bash League (WBBL). She has previously played for New South Wales, Tasmanian Tigers and Hobart Hurricanes, as well as for English county sides Berkshire and Devon, and the New Zealand team Canterbury Magicians.

Originally from Newcastle in the Hunter region of New South Wales, Hall was inspired as a young cricketer by Mark Waugh and Hunter area players Belinda Clark, Leah Poulton and Sarah Andrews.  At the end of the 2004–05 season, she won the Cricket NSW female Rising Star award.  However, NSW had such a strong women's cricket team that there was not a lot of opportunity for her in that state.

In 2009, Hall was recruited by Cricket Tasmania to play for Tasmania, as that team began its first season in the Women's National Cricket League.   After joining the Tasmania, she became a top order batter, and also a regular bowler.  She continued to live in Sydney and train with a Sydney-based coach, but travelled to Tasmania for training camps, pre-season tours and matches.

Hall was selected as a Hobart Hurricane for its inaugural WBBL01 competition (2015–16).  In a memorable performance that season against the Melbourne Renegades at Aurora Stadium in Launceston, she took two sharp catches, one of them in a one-handed leap, achieved two run outs, and was named player-of-the-match.

In July 2016, Hall was disciplined by Cricket Australia after admitting a charge of placing two bets relating to two matches in the Matador Cup competition.  She received a two-year ban, 18 months of which were suspended.  Cricket Tasmania announced that it would continue to support her, as she had accepted her penalty and apologised to the organisation, including the Cricket Tasmania Board, coaching staff and her teammates.  As the ban was backdated to the date in April 2016 when Cricket Australia was made aware of the breach, the active part of it expired in October 2016.

Hall remained contracted to Tasmania, and was selected in the Hurricanes squad for the WBBL02 season (2016–17). In November 2018, she was named in the Hobart Hurricanes' squad for the 2018–19 Women's Big Bash League season.

Off the field, Hall has studied Early Childhood and Nursing.  , she was managing a retail cricket store.

References

External links

Corinne Hall at Cricket Australia

1987 births
Australian women cricketers
Berkshire women cricketers
Canterbury Magicians cricketers
Cricketers from New South Wales
Devon women cricketers
Hobart Hurricanes (WBBL) cricketers
Living people
New South Wales Breakers cricketers
People from Gosford
Tasmanian Tigers (women's cricket) cricketers
Sydney Thunder (WBBL) cricketers